Melangyna  is a genus of hoverflies.

Species
Subgenus: Melangyna
 Melangyna  abietis  (Matsumura, 1918)
Melangyna arctica (Zetterstedt, 1838)
 Melangyna arsenjevi  (Mutin, 1986) 
Melangyna barbifrons (Fallén, 1817)
 Melangyna basarukini (Mutin, 1998)
Melangyna coei Nielsen, 1971 
Melangyna compositarum (Verrall, 1873) 
Melangyna ericarum (Collin, 1946) 
 Melangyna evittata (Huo & Ren, 2007)
Melangyna fisherii (Walton, 1911)
 Melangyna grandimaculata  (Huo & Ren, 2007)
 Melangyna heilongjiangensis (Huo, 2006) 
 Melangyna hwangi  (He & Li, 1992)
Melangyna labiatarum (Verrall, 1901)
Melangyna lasiophthalma (Zetterstedt, 1843) 
Melangyna lucifera Nielsen, 1980 
 Melangyna macromaculata  (Mutin, 1998)
 Melangyna  ochreolinea  (Hull, 1944) 
 Melangyna olsujevi  (Violovitsh, 1956) 
 Melangyna pavlovskyi  (Violovitsh, 1956) 
 Melangyna qinlingensis (Huo & Ren, 2007) 
Melangyna quadrimaculata Verrall, 1873 
Melangyna sexguttata Meigen, 1838
 Melangyna stackelbergi (Violovitsh, 1980)
Melangyna subfasciata (Curran, 1925)
 Melangyna  tsherepanovi (Violovitsh, 1965)
Melangyna umbellatarum (Fabricius, 1794) 
 Melangyna xiaowutaiensis  (Huo & Ren, 2007)

Subgenus: Austrosyrphus
Melangyna ambustus Walker, 1852
Melangyna collatus Walker, 1852
Melangyna damastor Walker, 1849
Melangyna jacksoni Bigot, 1884
Melangyna novaezealandiae (Macquart, 1855)
Melangyna sellenyi Schiner, 1868
Melangyna viridiceps (Macquart, 1847)

Subgenus: Melanosyrphus
Melangyna dichoptica Vockeroth, 1969

References

Hoverfly genera
Taxa named by George Henry Verrall
Syrphinae
Syrphini